Brighter Daze is the sixth collaboration album by Murs and 9th Wonder. It was released on December 31, 2015 by Jamla Records. The album is produced by 9th Wonder and features guest appearances by Rapsody, Problem, Bad Lucc, Mac Miller, Reuben Vincent, Propaganda, Vinny Radio, Franchise and Choo Jackson.

Track listing

References
 http://ambrosiaforheads.com/2015/12/murs-9th-wonder-announce-6th-collaborative-album-coming-today/
 http://www.rawdrive.com/2015/12/31/murs-9th-wonder-brighter-daze/
 https://web.archive.org/web/20160304093458/http://massappeal.com/premiere-murs-and-9th-wonder-brighter-daze/
 http://hiphopdx.com/reviews/id.2603/title.murs-9th-wonder-brighter-daze

2015 albums
Murs (rapper) albums
9th Wonder albums
Albums produced by 9th Wonder